Ashanti Martinez (born April 1996) is an American politician. He is currently a member of the Maryland House of Delegates from District 22 in Prince George's County, having been appointed to the seat by Governor Wes Moore to fill a vacancy left by the appointment of Alonzo T. Washington to the Maryland Senate. He previously ran for the House seat in 2018 and 2022.

Background
Born in Washington, D.C., Martinez grew up in a working-class family and was educated at Parkdale High School. He first got involved with politics when he was 14 years old as a member of the Prince George's County Young Democrats. In 2016, Martinez worked on the congressional campaign of state delegate Joseline Peña-Melnyk. After graduating from Howard University with a bachelor's degree in political science in 2018, he worked as the director of constituent services for Prince George's County councilmember Tom Dernoga. He then worked as a research and policy analyst for CASA de Maryland. Martinez also worked as an intern for U.S. Representatives Elijah Cummings and Steny Hoyer, an aide to the Maryland Legislative Latino Caucus, and as a campaign manager for Arkansas House of Representatives candidate Vivian Flowers.

In April 2017, Martinez announced that he would run for the Maryland House of Delegates in District 22. He was defeated in the Democratic primary, placing fifth with 10.1 percent of the vote.

In August 2021, Martinez announced that he would run for the Maryland House of Delegates in District 22, challenging incumbent state delegate Anne Healey. During the primary, he ran on a platform of improving education, transportation, infrastructure, health care, criminal justice reform, and the environment. He also ran on the issue of abortion, highlighting Healey's opposition to abortion rights. Martinez received endorsements from Pro-Choice Maryland Action and CASA de Maryland. Martinez came in fourth place in the Democratic primary, receiving 13.91 percent of the vote. Following his defeat, he became chief of staff for Prince George's County councilmember Krystal Oriadha.

In January 2023, Martinez filed to run for the nomination to fill the vacancy left by Alonzo T. Washington in District 22 of the Maryland House of Delegates. He was the only one to apply to the open seat and was nominated by the Prince George's County Democratic Central Committee on February 9.

In the legislature
Martinez was into the Maryland House of Delegates on February 24, 2023. He is a member of the House Health and Government Operations Committee. Martinez is the first Latino to represent District 22, and the first openly gay person to represent Prince George's County in the Maryland General Assembly.

Political positions

Environment
In May 2022, Martinez signed a Chesapeake Climate Action Network resolution to move Maryland to 100 percent carbon-free electricity by 2035 and to remove trash incineration from the state's "clean energy" classification.

Gun control
In June 2021, Martinez attended and spoke at a rally against gun violence in Landover, Maryland.

Health care
Martinez supports universal health care.

National politics
In October 2021, Martinez spoke in support of the Build Back Better Act.

Social issues
In May 2022, Martinez attended the Lets Say Gay Parade at the University of Maryland, College Park, where he spoke in support of the Trans Health Equity Act, a bill that would require the state's Medicaid program to provide coverage for gender-affirming treatment.

Martinez supports bringing the new Federal Bureau of Investigation headquarters to Prince George's County.

Personal life
Martinez is openly gay, coming out to his family at age 13. He lives in New Carrollton, Maryland.

Electoral history

References

External links
 
 

1996 births
21st-century African-American politicians
21st-century American politicians
African-American state legislators in Maryland
Gay politicians
Hispanic and Latino American state legislators in Maryland
Howard University alumni
LGBT African Americans
LGBT Hispanic and Latino American people
LGBT state legislators in Maryland
Living people
Democratic Party members of the Maryland House of Delegates